Shady Acres Entertainment is a production company founded in 1999 by producer and director Tom Shadyac. It is based at Universal Studios. It is taken from his last name, Shadyac, which separated and became two words "Shady" and "Acres". Shady Acres signed a production deal with Universal to produce films while its lone television series was co-produced by Touchstone Television (now ABC Signature).

On June 4, 1999, Shady Acres received a television shingle, which would be based at Touchstone Television (now ABC Signature). Although the company produced a handful of pilots, only one of them would go on the air.

On February 14, 2008, Universal decided to cut ties with that Shady Acres Entertainment studio, and became an independent production outfit.

Nicole Pritchett was the head of development and production at Shady Acres Entertainment from 2009 until 2015, along with one of the Producers of the documentary I AM.

Filmography
Dragonfly (2002) (with Spyglass Entertainment)
Bruce Almighty (2003) (with Pit Bull Productions)
Accepted (2006)
I Now Pronounce You Chuck & Larry (2007) (with Relativity Media and Happy Madison Productions)
Evan Almighty (2007) (with Original Film)
 I Am (2011) (with Homemande Canvas Productions)

Television series
8 Simple Rules for Dating My Teenage Daughter (2003) (with Touchstone Television)

References

1999 establishments in California
American companies established in 1999
Companies based in Los Angeles County, California
Entertainment companies based in California
Film production companies of the United States
Mass media companies established in 1999
Television production companies of the United States